Zack Lively (born March 20, 1987) is an American actor best known for his role as Heath on the ABC Family show GRΣΣK. Lively was born in Nampa, Idaho. He has also appeared in numerous television movies.

Filmography

Film

Television

References

External links 

 
  Heroes Wiki 

1987 births
Living people
People from Nampa, Idaho
21st-century American male actors
American male television actors
Male actors from Idaho